Bela Mitra, née Bose (1920 – 31 July 1952) was a Bengali revolutionary involved with the Jhansi Rani Regiment, the Women's Regiment of the Indian National Army, and a social worker.

Family
Mitra was born as Amita or Bela Bose in Kodalia, undivided 24 Parganas in British India. Her father was Suresh Chandra Bose. She was the niece of Subhas Chandra Bose. She married freedom fighter Haridas Mitra in 1936. Haridas later became the deputy Speaker of West Bengal Assembly. Their son Amit Mitra is an economist and present finance Minister of the State of West Bengal.

Activities
Mitra took active part in anti British movement since 1940 while Subhas Chandra Bose left Ramgarh Session of the Indian National Congress. Her husband Haridas Mitra was a member of secret service team of Azad Hind Fauj. Smt. Mitra joined in Indian National Army and worked in Jhansi Rani Brigade. She gave shelters to the revolutionaries came outside of India, operated transmitter of Azad Hind Radio and sent information to Singapore from Kolkata since January to October in 1944. While her husband Haridas Mitra was arrested and sentenced to death on 21 June 1945, she went to Poona, prayed to Mahatma Gandhi to pursue for acquittal of her husband to the British Government. Gandhi wrote letters to the then Viceroy of India, Lord Wavell, to commute the death sentence, and subsequently Haridas Mitra get released along with three others Jyotish Basu, Amar Singh Gill, Pabitra Roy. In 1947 Smt. Mitra formed a social organisation, Jhansir Rani Relief Team. In 1950 she started worked in Abhaynagar near Dankuni for the development of refugees came from East Pakistan.

Legacy 
Smt Mitra died in 1952. Belanagar railway station in Howrah district on the Howrah-Bardhaman Chord line, is named after her in 1958. This was the first Railway station in India named after any Indian woman.

References

1920 births
1952 deaths
Indian National Army personnel
Indian people of World War II
Indian revolutionaries
Indian women of World War II
Social workers
People from Kolkata
Social workers from West Bengal
Indian independence activists from West Bengal